Aqmangit (Karakalpak: Ақмаңғыт, Aqmańǵit) is a town and seat of Nukus district in Karakalpakstan in Uzbekistan. The town population in 1989 was 6,169 people.

References

Populated places in Karakalpakstan
Urban-type settlements in Uzbekistan